Volgelsheim is a commune in the Haut-Rhin department in Grand Est in north-eastern France. The population in 2007 was 2,322.

History
Volgelsheim was first mentioned in 739 under the name Folcoaldeshaim. The name has changed several times over the centuries to the present spelling. From 1871 to 1918, it belonged to the kingdom Volgelsheim country Alsace-Lorraine in the German Empire. During this time, in 1880, a station was built in Prussian style. Until 1992, the French army had a garrison in Volgelsheim (Abbatucci barracks).

See also
 Communes of the Haut-Rhin department

References

Communes of Haut-Rhin